Singa Machan Charlie is a 2015 Sri Lankan Sinhala action comedy film directed by Lal Weerasinghe and produced by Raj Ranasinghe. It stars Tennyson Cooray, Lal Weerasinghe, and Anusha Damayanthi in lead roles with Sando Harris and Suraj Mapa. It is the 1242nd Sri Lankan film in the Sinhala cinema. This film brought debut acting for popular actress Dilani Abeywardana's daughter Kaveesha Kavindi.

Plot

Cast
 Tennyson Cooray as Charlie
 Anusha Damayanthi as Chami
 Lal Weerasinghe as Ramesh
 Suraj Mapa as Romeo
 Udayanthi Kulathunga as Isha
 Sando Harris as Sergeant Rivilsan
 Kaveesha Kavindi
 Nandana Hettiarachchi
 Mark Samson
 Anrua Bandara Rajaguru
 Vishaka Siriwardana
 Damitha Saluwadana

Soundtrack

References

External links
මම කරදරකාර නළුවෙක් නෙමෙයි

2015 films
2010s Sinhala-language films